Lak Lag (also Romanized as Lak Lak, Laklak, and Laq Laq) is a village in Tabadkan Rural District, in the Central District of Mashhad County, Razavi Khorasan Province, Iran. At the 2006 census, its population was 296, in 73 families.

References 

Populated places in Mashhad County